Carolle J. Kitchens, who writes as Carolle J. Carter, (born July 1934) is an American historian who has written on German espionage in Ireland during World War II (1977) and on American liaison with Chinese communists in 1944–47 (1997). She has taught at Menlo College and Foothill Community College in California as well as San Jose State University and San Jose City College.

Selected publications
 The Shamrock and the Swastika: German Espionage in Ireland in World War II. Pacific Books, Palo Alto, 1977. 
 "John P. Duggan. Neutral Ireland and the Third Reich", The American Historical Review, Vol. 93, No. 1 (Feb., 1988), pp. 158–159.
 Mission to Yenan: American Liaison with the Chinese Communists, 1944-1947. University Press of Kentucky, 1997.

References 

Living people
American historians
American women historians
Historians of Ireland
1934 births
Menlo College
San Jose State University faculty
21st-century American women